Legacy House is a non-profit assisted living facility managed by the Seattle Chinatown International District Public Development Association (SCIDpda). It was built in 1998 in response to an increasing need for affordable, cultural diverse services in the neighborhood of the Seattle China-International District to accommodate its senior population. Legacy House is the only assisted living facility in Seattle that emphasizes serving one hundred percent Asian and Pacific Islander clientele. Their staff speaks over 15 Asian languages in order to help its residents communicate better and services low-income members of Seattle's Asian communities exclusively. Many of their members have been pioneers of the Seattle Asian-American community.

Legacy House also offers adult day services, that caters to over a hundred seniors that come for part of the day. In addition, they also run group activities such as bingo, mahjong, group dancing class, and tai chi. One major feature of this facility is that they serve traditional Asian cuisine on the daily basis and celebrate the festivities from all the residents' cultures. Legacy house is also a clinically advanced facility and provides occupational therapy for clients with strokes, gout, arthritis and mental health counseling for clients who are physically and mentally unstable. Legacy House was built next to the Denise Early Childhood Education Center with the belief that developing inter-generational relationships will benefit both seniors and children.

External links
 SCIDpda official website
 Legacy House official website

References 

Organizations based in Seattle
1998 establishments in Washington (state)
Asian-American organizations
Medical and health organizations based in Washington (state)
Nursing homes in the United States